Miss Universe Malaysia 2017, the 51st edition of the Miss Universe Malaysia, was held on 23 February 2017 at the Majestic Hotel, Kuala Lumpur. She then represented Malaysia at the Miss Universe 2017 pageant in Las Vegas, United States.

Results

Gala Night Judges 

 Andrea Fonseka – Former Miss Malaysia Universe 2004 and former national director of Miss Universe Malaysia
 Dato' Hans Isaac – Malaysian actor, Writer, Director and Producer
 Judrieana Jamaludin - Marketing Manager (Malaysia), NBCUniversal International Networks
 Shawn Loong – Malaysian hair stylist
 Rizman Nordin –  Malaysian fashion designer
 Datuk Sri Navneet Goenka - Founder & Vice President of CERES Jewels
 Debbie Goh –  Actress and former beauty queen

Pre-interview Judges 

 Andrea Fonseka – Miss Universe Malaysia 2004
 Kartini Arrifin –  Director of iM4U Radio
 Hui Mathews – Founder of ash be nimble
 Sunita Chhabra – Editor, Life Inspired (a pull-out in The Star)
 Dato' Sri Raja Rezza Shah @ Shah Rezza -  Movie Producer, Founder of the Islamic Fashion Festival (IFF) 2006
 Lina Tan - Filmmaker

Special awards

Contestants
Official 17 Finalists of Miss Universe Malaysia 2017.

Top 50 
The Top 50 contestants was announced via Miss Universe Malaysia official website.
 The contestant that was chosen as official candidate.

Crossovers 
Contestants who previously competed/appeared at other national beauty pageants:

Miss Glam World
 2018 -Tanalaksiumy M. Rayer (Top 15/Miss Fitness Collabs)

Miss Glam Malaysia
 2018 -Tanalaksiumy M. Rayer (Winner)

Glam Next Face Malaysia
 2018 - Sonia Naidu Devakrishnan (Winner)

Face of Beauty International 
 2017 - Ollemadthee Kunasagaran (4th Runner-up)

Face of Beauty Malaysia
 2017 - Ollemadthee Kunasagaran (Winner)

Miss India Penang
 2016 - Ollemadthee Kunasagaran (Winner)

Miss Global International Sabah
 2016 - Dewina Petrus Guriting (2nd Runner-up)

Unduk Ngadau
 2016 - Laura Simon   
(Represent Likas)

Unduk Ngadau Kota Kinabalu
 2016 - Laura Simon (1st Runner-up)
 2016 - Dewina Petrus Guriting (5th Runner-up)

Unduk Ngadau Pertisa
 2016 - Dewina Petrus Guriting (1st Runner-up)

Miss Borneo Kebaya
 2015 - Sonia Naidu Devakrishnan (Winner)

Miss Earth Sabah
 2015 - Dewina Petrus Guriting (Finalists Top 12)

Miss Scuba Sabah 
 2014 - Dewina Petrus Guriting (2nd Runner-up)

Miss Universe Malaysia
 2013 - Samantha Katie James (Top 8)

Miss Global International 
 2013 - Dewina Petrus Guriting (Finalists Top 18)

Miss World Malaysia
 2012 - Jaspreet Kaur Gill (Finalists Top 17)

Miss Earth Sabah
 2011 - Dewina Petrus Guriting (Finalists Top 12)

Unduk Ngadau Sabah
 2011 - Laura Simon

Unduk Ngadau Klang
 2011 - Laura Simon (Winner)

Miss Tourism Queen International Borneo
 2010 - Dewina Petrus Guriting (Finalists Top 10)

References

External links

2017 in Malaysia
2017 beauty pageants
2017
February 2017 events in Malaysia